Josh Geary (born 11 December 1984) is a New Zealand professional golfer who plays on the Challenge Tour.

Professional career
Geary turned professional in 2007 and played primarily on the Canadian Tour until 2010. He won the Saskatchewan Open in 2008 and was runner-up in the 2010 The Economical Insurance Group Seaforth Country Classic behind Kent Eger. He was also a runner-up in the 2009 New Zealand PGA Championship and 4th in the New Zealand Open the following week, events co-sanctioned with the Nationwide Tour.

In 2011, Geary played a full season on the Nationwide Tour. In 25 starts, his best finish was tied for 5th place in the Midwest Classic. He was third in the New Zealand Open at the end of the year. Geary played five events at the start of the 2012 Nationwide Tour season but missed the cut on each occasion. From 2012 to early 2015, Geary played mostly on the PGA Tour of Australasia and the OneAsia Tour. He tied for third place in the 2013 New Zealand PGA Championship and won the Western Australian Open later that year. He lost in a playoff for the 2014 Mazda New South Wales Open and was a joint runner-up in the 2015 New Zealand PGA Championship.

In 2015, Geary played in the second season of the PGA Tour China. He won three tournaments and finished second in the Order of Merit to gain a place on the Web.com Tour for 2016. At the start of 2016, he was again a joint runner-up in the New Zealand PGA Championship. Geary played 16 events on the Web.com Tour but only the cut 5 times with a best place finish of 6th in the Servientrega Championship.

Geary played on the China Tour in 2017, winning the Yulongwan Yunnan Open. At the end of 2017, he finished in 9th place in the European Tour Q-school to gain a place on the tour for 2018. Geary played 22 events on the 2018 European Tour but only has one top-10 finish and was 177th in the Order of Merit. At the end of 2018, he again played well in the European Tour Q-school, missing out on qualification for the main tour by a single stroke but gaining a place on the Challenge Tour for 2019. Geary started 2019 with a runner-up finish in the New Zealand Open and was also runner-up in the D+D Real Slovakia Challenge.

Professional wins (13)

PGA Tour of Australasia wins (1)

PGA Tour of Australasia playoff record (0–1)

Canadian Tour wins (1)

China Tour wins (4)

Charles Tour wins (6)

Golf Tour of New Zealand wins (1)
2006 Carrus Tauranga Open (as an amateur)

Results in major championships

CUT = missed the halfway cut
Note: Geary only played in The Open Championship.

Team appearances
Amateur
Eisenhower Trophy (representing New Zealand): 2004, 2006
Nomura Cup (representing New Zealand): 2005
Bonallack Trophy (representing Asia/Pacific): 2006

See also
2017 European Tour Qualifying School graduates

References

External links
 
 
 
 

New Zealand male golfers
European Tour golfers
Sportspeople from Invercargill
1984 births
Living people